The Battle of Abukir of 8 March 1801 was the second pitched battle of the French campaign in Egypt and Syria to be fought at Abu Qir on the Mediterranean coast, near the Nile Delta.

The landing of the British expeditionary force under Sir Ralph Abercromby was intended to defeat or drive out an estimated 21,000 remaining troops of Napoleon's ill-fated invasion of Egypt. The fleet commanded by Baron Keith included seven ships of the line, five frigates and a dozen armed corvettes. With the troop transports, it was delayed in the bay for several days by strong gales and heavy seas before disembarkation could proceed.

The French garrison of Alexandria under General Friant, some 2000 French troops and ten field guns in high positions took a heavy toll of a large British force disembarking from a task-force fleet in boats, each carrying 50 men to be landed on the beach. The British then rushed and overwhelmed the defenders with fixed bayonets and secured the position, enabling an orderly landing of the remainder of their 17,500-strong army and its equipment. The skirmish was a prelude to the Battle of Alexandria and resulted in British losses of 730 killed and wounded or missing. The French withdrew, losing at least 300 dead or wounded and eight pieces of cannon.

Napoleon later described the British landing as "one of the most vigorous actions which could be imagined".

Orders of battle

British

French

See also
 Battle of the Nile or Battle of Abukir Bay (1798)
 Battle of Abukir (1799)

Citations

References

 
 
 
 
.
.

External links

Conflicts in 1801
Battles of the French Revolutionary Wars
Battles involving Ottoman Egypt
Battles involving the United Kingdom
1801 in Egypt
Egypt–United Kingdom relations
France–United Kingdom relations
French campaign in Egypt and Syria
March 1801 events
Amphibious operations involving the United Kingdom
Abukir

arz:معركة ابو قير البحريه